AD OPT is the airline crew planning division of  IBS Software.

History
AD OPT was founded in 1987 by Jean Éthier, Pierre Lestage, Daniel McInnis, François Soumis and Pierre Trudeau all operational researchers from the decision analysis research group, GERAD, and the CRT (Centre de Recherche sur les Transports/ Research Center on Transportation) in Montreal, Quebec, Canada. Originally, they worked on developing truck itinerary management software for mining companies. It was only later that the company concentrated on developing software to manage crew planning (Altitude) and shift worker schedules (ShiftLogic).

In 1999, the company was listed on the Toronto Stock Exchange (TSX) under AOP. With ShiftLogic, they later expanded their horizons into other industries including manufacturing, hospitality, and transportation, among others. In 2001, AD OPT purchased Total Care Technologies to include staff scheduling in the healthcare industry to their product list.

AD OPT's operational research team maintains close ties with GERAD and its teams by funding some of their research projects in the aviation scheduling domain.

In 2004, AD OPT Technologies Inc. was acquired by Kronos Incorporated and in 2019, AD OPT was acquired by the aviation and transportation IT services provider IBS Software.

In June 2015, AD OPT received the CORS Omond Solandt Award for Excellence in Operational Research.

Clients
Some of Ad Opt's clients (present and past) include:
Air Canada
easyJet
Emirates Airlines
Etihad Airways
FedEx
Qantas Airways
South African Airlines
United Airlines
UPS
US Airways
Virgin Australia

References

Business software companies
Companies based in Montreal
Software companies established in 1987
Transportation planning